Omobola Olubusola Johnson (born 28 June 1963) is a Nigerian technocrat and the Honorary Chairperson of the global Alliance for Affordable Internet (A4AI). She is also a former and first Minister of Communication Technology in the cabinet of President Goodluck Jonathan.

Education
She was educated at the International School Ibadan and the University of Manchester (BEng, Electrical and Electronic Engineering) and King's College London (MSc, Digital Electronics). She has a Doctorate in Business Administration (DBA) from Cranfield University.

Career
Prior to her Ministerial appointment she was country managing director for Accenture, Nigeria. She had worked with Accenture since 1985 when it was Andersen Consulting. Johnson is the pioneer head of the country's communication technology ministry, which was created as part of the transformation agenda of the Nigerian government.

Johnson co-founded a women's organization, WIMBIZ in 2001. She has earned several public commendation since taking up her first government assignment as minister in 2011. This is following the numerous achievements of her ministry notably among which is the launch of the NigComSat-IR Satellite. This has helped to complement the country's efforts at fibre connectivity and the provision of greater bandwidth. The ministry under her watch has also deployed more than 700 personal computers to secondary schools in the first phase of School Access Programme (SAP) while about 193 tertiary institutions in the country now have internet access in the Tertiary Institution Access Programme ( TIAP) and 146 communities have access to Community Communication Centers deployed around the country.

Other achievements of the ministry under Johnson include:

A collaboration with the Central Bank of Nigeria to drive digital and financial inclusion using the Post Office infrastructure;
10Gbs Fibre optic Network to connect Nigerian Universities to wider research and education universe, in partnership with the NUC, World Bank and TetFund;
Facilitating e-Government drive with over 86,000 email addresses deployed for Government use on the .gov.ng domain names, and 250 websites hosted on .gov.ng platform as well as 382 MDAs connected in Abuja and other parts of the country;
Creating the enabling environment for local development of iPad-equivalent tablets;
Signing of an MoU with Nokia to establish a lab in Nigeria to support the domestic mobile software industry;
Inauguration of the National Council on Information Communication Technology with state / FCT Commissioner of ICT as members.

On 30 May 2013, Omobola presented the Nigerian National Broadband Plan for 2013 to 2018 to President Goodluck Jonathan. Following a cabinet reshuffle by President Goodluck Jonathan in September 2013,  she was given an extra task of supervising the operations of the Federal Ministry of Science and Technology.

Omobola is currently a non-executive director of Guinness Nigeria PLC, MTN and Chairperson of Custodian and Allied Insurance Limited. She is also a senior partner with the Venture Capital Firm TLCOM.

Personal life
Omobola is married with children. Her father-in-law was Mobolaji Johnson.

References

External links 

 Profiling Omobola Johnson’s 4 Years as Nigeria’s ICT Minister
 Nigeria’s Former ICT Minister, Dr. Omobola Johnson is now a Venture Capitalist
 Alliance for Affordable Internet appoints Omobola Johnson as its Honorary Chairperson

1963 births
Living people
Alumni of the University of Manchester
Alumni of King's College London
Alumni of Cranfield University
International School, Ibadan alumni
Yoruba women in politics
Nigerian venture capitalists
Nigerian women in business
Yoruba women in business
Nigerian women engineers
Yoruba women engineers
Nigerian chairpersons of corporations
Nigerian women business executives
Communication ministers of Nigeria
Women government ministers of Nigeria
Women corporate directors
Lagos Business School alumni
Nigerian expatriates in the United Kingdom